Peter Creed (born 31 March 1987 in Caerphilly) is a professional squash player who represents Wales. He reached a career-high world ranking of World No. 50 in November in 2018.

Personal
Creed attended Millfield School.

References

External links 
 
 
 

Welsh male squash players
Living people
1987 births
Squash players at the 2014 Commonwealth Games
Squash players at the 2018 Commonwealth Games
Commonwealth Games competitors for Wales
People educated at Millfield